Paweł Papke (born 13 February 1977) is a Polish politician and former volleyball player, current member of the Polish parliament. In the past, he was part of the Polish national team and a president of the Polish Volleyball Federation.

Personal life
Papke was born in Starogard Gdański, Poland. He is married to Iwona Oleś. They have a son Szymon and a daughter Martyna.

Sporting achievements

As a player
 National championships
 1997/1998  Polish Championship, with KS Mostostal ZA Kędzierzyn
 1999/2000  Polish Cup, with Mostostal Azoty Kędzierzyn-Koźle
 1999/2000  Polish Championship, with Mostostal Azoty Kędzierzyn-Koźle
 2000/2001  Polish Cup, with Mostostal Azoty Kędzierzyn-Koźle
 2000/2001  Polish Championship, with Mostostal Azoty Kędzierzyn-Koźle
 2001/2002  Polish Cup, with Mostostal Azoty Kędzierzyn-Koźle
 2001/2002  Polish Championship, with Mostostal Azoty Kędzierzyn-Koźle
 2002/2003  Polish Championship, with Mostostal Azoty Kędzierzyn-Koźle

Youth national team
 1996  CEV U20 European Championship
 1997  FIVB U21 World Championship

Individual awards
 2008: CEV Challenge Cup – Best Opposite

References

External links

 Player profile at PlusLiga.pl 
 Player Profile at Volleybox.net

1977 births
Living people
People from Starogard Gdański
Sportspeople from Pomeranian Voivodeship
Polish men's volleyball players
Polish Champions of men's volleyball
Members of the Polish Sejm 2011–2015
Members of the Polish Sejm 2015–2019
Members of the Polish Sejm 2019–2023
ZAKSA Kędzierzyn-Koźle players
AZS Olsztyn players
Resovia (volleyball) players
Opposite hitters